Donald George Powell (born 10 September 1946) is an English musician who was the drummer for glam rock and later hard rock group Slade for over fifty years.

Early life 
As a child, Powell joined the Boy Scouts where he became interested in the drums after being asked to join the band on a Sunday morning parade. After attending Etheridge Secondary Modern School he studied Metallurgy at Wednesbury Technical College. Powell then worked as a metallurgist in a small foundry before turning professional as a drummer. He was athletic and a keen amateur boxer, although an easy going personality. It was he who was sent around with the money collection hat amongst early audiences.

Powell became a member of The Vendors, a band that guitarist Dave Hill later joined. The Vendors became the N'Betweens and bass guitarist / keyboard player / violinist / guitarist Jim Lea joined at an audition. Powell then spotted Noddy Holder playing with Steve Brett & The Mavericks and he and Hill got Holder to join the N'Betweens. They regrouped as Ambrose Slade, changed the name to Slade and the success began.

Songwriting
He co-wrote a number of Slade's earlier songs, mainly with Lea; many of them can be found on the 1970 Slade album Play it Loud. He also co-wrote one of Slade's Top 10 hits "Look Wot You Dun" with Holder and Lea in 1972, and made the breathing noises in the background of the song.

Drum choice
Powell started drumming on a borrowed Olympic kit as a youngster. He moved up to a deep blue Hayman set for his work with Slade until the early 1970s. From there he changed to Ludwig, but in the mid-2000s he switched to Pearl as the original Ludwig firm had changed ownership. Currently he states he likes a four-piece kit with a shallow snare drum.

Accident 
At 1 am on 4 July 1973, when Slade were popular in Europe and number one in the UK Singles Chart with "Skweeze Me Pleeze Me", Don Powell was severely injured in a serious car crash at Compton Road West, Wolverhampton, in which his 20-year-old fiancée Angela Morris was killed. On a bend in the road, the car hit a hedge and a road sign and then smashed into a wall. Powell fractured his skull, smashed several teeth, broke both of his ankles and five of his ribs. Surgeons had to drill into his skull to ease the internal pressure and he was unconscious for six days but he came round and eventually pulled through, finding the best therapy to be work. Both Powell and Morris had been flung out of the car so it was impossible to tell who had been driving. Powell was unable to attend Morris's cremation six weeks later. He left hospital on 30 July and by mid-August was back recording with the group. When the Top 5 hit "My Friend Stan" was recorded, Powell was walking with the aid of a stick and had to be lifted onto his drum-kit. The accident left Powell with no senses of taste and smell, and he still has severe problems with his short-term memory, whilst his long-term memory has remained unaffected.

Post-Slade career
After Slade split up in February 1992, Powell owned and operated an antique import/export company before he reconvened the band as Slade II later that year with Dave Hill. He remained active with various line-ups. In 1994, the band released the album Keep on Rockin'. The name of the band was shortened back to Slade in 1997. In 2000, Powell had a small cameo role in the BBC TV version of Lorna Doone.

Powell has been married twice and for a number of years lived in Bexhill-on-Sea, East Sussex, England. In 2004, he moved to Silkeborg, Denmark where he now lives with his Danish wife Hanna.

In December 2005, Powell appeared in the Channel 4 TV documentary Bring Back...The Christmas Number One.

A long-time fan of Ringo Starr, Powell contributed the foreword to the 2016 book Ringo Starr and the Beatles Beat by Alex Cain and Terry McCusker. As the drummer with Colonel Bagshot, McCusker toured with Slade in the 1970s and the two have remained firm friends.

Powell is now one-third of the group Quatro Scott Powell (QSP) alongside Suzi Quatro and Sweet guitarist Andy Scott. Don has played at two of Scott's 'Concert at the Kings' events at All Cannings in Wiltshire, and in 2017 he contributed towards a BBC Radio Wiltshire documentary of the life of former Status Quo guitarist Rick Parfitt.

In late 2019, Powell's side project, Don Powell's Occasional Flames, featuring Les Glover on lead vocals and guitar, and Paul Cookson's lyrics and poetry, released their first album and single which charted on several download sites, the highest position being 23 on Amazon chart.

In February 2020, Powell announced that he had been fired by email by Dave Hill and would be forming Don Powell's Slade to perform Slade songs.

Biography
Powell collaborated with Lise Lyng Falkenberg on his biography since 2006, in part using the notebooks and diaries he kept due to his problems with short term memory following his 1973 accident. The biography, titled Look Wot I Dun – My Life in Slade was released via the publisher Music Sales Ltd in October 2013. It covers in detail Slade's long career and Powell's life, which included booze-ups with Ozzy Osbourne. In 2013, Powell created his own website, and in early 2014 he published his diary entries for 1977 and 1978.

References

1946 births
Living people
English rock drummers
People from Bilston
English songwriters
Musicians from the West Midlands (county)
Glam rock musicians
Slade members
English autobiographers